Johnson Run is a  long 1st order tributary to the Youghiogheny River in Fayette County, Pennsylvania.

Course

Watershed
Johnson Run drains  of area, receives about 46.5 in/year of precipitation, has a wetness index of 317.21, and is about 95% forested.

See also
List of rivers of Pennsylvania

References

Tributaries of the Youghiogheny River
Rivers of Pennsylvania
Rivers of Fayette County, Pennsylvania